The shooting competitions at the 2000 Summer Olympics were carried out at the Sydney International Shooting Centre in Liverpool, New South Wales, Australia during the first week of the Games, from Saturday 16 September 2000 to Saturday 23 September 2000.

While the rifle, pistol and running target rules were largely unchanged from the Atlanta Games, two new events were added, raising the number of individual Olympic shooting events to an all-time high of seventeen.

Medal summary

Medal table

Men's events

Women's events

Participating nations
A total of 408 shooters, 262 men and 146 women, from 103 nations competed at the Sydney Games:

References

External links

 
2000 Summer Olympics events
2000
Olympics
Shooting competitions in Australia